Orthoclydon is a genus of moths in the family Geometridae. This genus is endemic to New Zealand. This genus was first described in 1894 by William Warren.

Species 
Species within the genus include:

 Orthoclydon chlorias (Meyrick, 1883)
 Orthoclydon praefectata (Walker, 1861)
 Orthoclydon pseudostinaria (Hudson, 1918)

References

Geometridae
Geometridae genera
Endemic fauna of New Zealand
Endemic moths of New Zealand